Magyar Testgyakorlók Köre Budapest Futball Club is a professional football club based in Budapest, Hungary.

Matches

Record by country of opposition 
 Correct as of 21 July 2016

 P – Played; W – Won; D – Drawn; L – Lost

Club record in UEFA competitions 
As correct of 22 June 2015.
 Biggest win: 27 August 1998, MTK 7–0  Gøta, Budapest
 Biggest defeat: 6 August 2008, MTK 0–5  Fenerbahçe, Budapest and 20 October 1993,  Mechelen 5–0 MTK, Mechelen
 Appearances in UEFA Champions League:  7
 Appearances in UEFA Cup Winners' Cup:  4
 Appearances in UEFA Europa League:  12
 Player with most UEFA appearances: 27  Illés
 Top scorers in UEFA club competitions: 10  Palotás

References

External links 

Hungarian football clubs in international competitions
European